Michael Mulvey may refer to:

 Michael Mulvey (photographer) - American photographer
 Michael Mulvey (bishop) - American bishop
 Mike Mulvey -  Australian-English footballer